129th may refer to:

129th (South Western) Brigade, British Territorial Force division formed in 1908
129th (Wentworth) Battalion, CEF, unit in the Canadian Expeditionary Force during the First World War
129th Delaware General Assembly, meeting of the legislative branch of the Delaware state government
129th Duke of Connaught's Own Baluchis, infantry regiment of the British Indian Army raised in 1846 as the 2nd Bellochee Battalion
129th Field Artillery Regiment (United States), regiment of the Field Artillery Branch of the United States Army
129th Illinois Volunteer Infantry Regiment, American infantry regiment that served in the Union Army during the American Civil War
129th Infantry Brigade (United Kingdom), 1st Line Territorial Army brigade during the Second World War
129th Infantry Division (Wehrmacht), Infantry Division of the German Army during World War II
129th Infantry Regiment (United States), United States military unit of the Illinois National Guard
129th Kentucky Derby or 2003 Kentucky Derby
129th meridian east, line of longitude across the Arctic Ocean, Asia, Australia, the Indian Ocean, the Southern Ocean and Antarctica
129th meridian west, line of longitude across the Arctic Ocean, North America, the Pacific Ocean, the Southern Ocean and Antarctica
129th Ohio General Assembly, the current legislative body of the state of Ohio for 2011 and 2012
129th Ohio Infantry (or 129th OVI), infantry regiment in the Union Army during the American Civil War
129th Regiment of Foot, infantry regiment of the British Army, created in 1794 and disbanded in 1796
129th Rescue Squadron, unit of the California Air National Guard
129th Rescue Wing, unit of the California Air National Guard
129th Strategic Reconnaissance Squadron, inactive United States Air Force unit
129th Street (IRT Third Avenue Line), massive station on the IRT Third Avenue Line in the New York City Subway system
129th Street (Manhattan), street in Manhattan
129th Toronto Scouting Group in Ontario, Canada
Pennsylvania's 129th Representative District or Pennsylvania House of Representatives

See also
129 (number)
AD 129, the year 129 (CXXIX) of the Julian calendar
129 BC